The House of Manderscheid was the name of the most powerful family in the Eifel region of Germany for a considerable period of time in the 15th century. When Dietrich died on 20 February 1498, he had appointed his sons Johann, Konrad and Wilhelm as new rulers – the family property had been distributed in 1488. Each of the sons founded a powerful lineage: Johann started the Manderscheid-Blankenheim-Gerolstein line, William the Manderscheid-Kail line, and Konrad (Cuno) the Manderscheid-Schleiden line. Augusta von Manderscheid-Blankenheim was the last countess. She was married to a member of the Bohemian nobility, Count Philipp Christian von Sternberg (1732–1811).

The Manderscheid-Kail lineage
The ancestral seat was the former moated castle in Oberkail, and because of this, Oberkail gained and maintained considerable importance in the Eifel region for several centuries. The moated palace is no longer standing – the last count of Oberkail died without descendants in 1762, the moated castle was destroyed and Oberkail returned to the status of a non-notable Eifel village.

Witch-hunts and French takeover
The Eifel was underdeveloped and troubled by plagues, witch-hunts and feuds in the 17th century. Within the area of the Manderscheider counties, approximately 260 people were executed as witches between 1528 and 1641. In other regions of Germany, reformation and technical inventions had led to great progress. In 1794, French revolutionary troops took control of the Rhine country and the Eifel region without great bloodshed and eliminated the aristocracy and the feudal system. Taxes such as socage duty, tithes and local customs duties were abolished. French became the official language, the judiciary system was updated and the economy in the Eifel experienced a boost.

Archives
The originals of certificates and documents (such as deeds of ownership and commercial documents) that the family had taken with them on their flight to Bohemia are stored in the National Museum in Prague. After these documents were copied onto microfilm in the 1970s, a copy was stored in an archive in Brauweiler near Cologne. The documents are still awaiting a scientific evaluation.

1480s disestablishments in the Holy Roman Empire
1488 disestablishments in Europe
German noble families
States and territories established in the 18th century
Lower Rhenish-Westphalian Circle
History of the Rhineland
Former states and territories of Rhineland-Palatinate
Counties of the Holy Roman Empire
Eifel in the Middle Ages